The 1962–63 Washington State Cougars men's basketball team represented Washington State University for the 1962–63 NCAA college basketball season. Led by fifth-year head coach Marv Harshman, the Cougars were new members of the Athletic Association of Western Universities (AAWU,  and played their home games on campus at Bohler Gymnasium in Pullman, Washington.

The Cougars were  overall in the regular season, and dropped both games to rival 

Because they were approved for AAWU membership in June 1962 and formally joined a few weeks later, the schedules for this season were already in place. Washington State did not play any of the four AAWU members from California, so they were effectively an independent for a fourth consecutive year. A full league schedule began the following season.

It was a difficult year, as the Cougars were 1–15 against former Northern Division members of the Pacific Coast Conference: Washington (0–2), Oregon (0–5), Oregon State (0–4), and Palouse neighbor

References

External links
Sports Reference – Washington State Cougars: 1962–63 basketball season

Washington State Cougars men's basketball seasons
Washington State Cougars
Washington State
Washington State